Kerlouan is a commune in the Finistère department of Brittany in northwestern France not far from Brest. It also contains the village of Meneham.

Population
Inhabitants of Kerlouan are called in French Kerlouanais.

Fishing hamlet of Meneham

The village of Meneham, locate in Pagan county (bro bagan), was initially built as a lookout post in the 17th century by Vauban. The main building has the distinction of having a stone roof. The inhabitants came to steal the wood used for the fire.

The lookout is built around many huge granite rocks. This village is almost deserted and in disrepair in the 1990s. A rehabilitation operation is then initiated from 2004.

The old cottage is now the Village Inn (restaurant).

Sights
 Kerlouan transmitter, for transmitting orders to submerged submarines in VLF-range.
 The coast is another great point of interest, as are the beaches of "Boutrouille" and "Le Fanal", and for climbers the "île aux vaches".
Le Gallion restaurant is located in the northwestern part of the main town.

See also
Communes of the Finistère department
Yann Larhantec

References

External links

   Cultural Heritage

Communes of Finistère